Clock House railway station is in the London Borough of Bromley in south east London, in Travelcard Zone 4 between Beckenham and Penge. The station and all trains serving it are operated by Southeastern on the Hayes line.

The station, which was opened by the South Eastern Railway in 1890, is named after the nearby residence of the Cator Family, demolished in 1896. Clock House retains its original street level booking hall and the remnants of its platform canopies and was formerly known for its tendency to flood whenever overwhelmed by the Chaffinch brook. The station name can be spelt either Clock House or Clockhouse. For example, the previous station signage used the latter (historically inaccurate) form, whilst the published timetables use the former version. The new Southeastern re-branded station signage and livery has since corrected this inaccuracy.

History

Early years (1857-1922)
The Mid-Kent line was built by the Mid-Kent and North Kent Junction Railway (MK&NKJR) and was opened on 1 January 1857 as far as Beckenham Junction. From opening the line was worked by the South Eastern Railway (SER).

Seven years later the MK&NKJR built an extension from a new junction station at New Beckenham to Croydon (Addiscombe Road) with an intermediate station at Elmers End, which again was operated by the SER.

House building commenced in the area in 1885 and Clock House station was opened on 1 May 1890 and was named after a nearby mansion. The station was equipped with a goods yard on the down side from opening. The 18-lever signal box was located on the up side at the south end of the station.

The Elmers End – Hayes section was built by the West Wickham & Hayes Railway, but was sold to the South Eastern Railway on opening day, 29 May 1882.

In 1898 the South Eastern Railway and its bitter rivals the London Chatham and Dover Railway agreed to work as one railway company under the name of the South Eastern and Chatham Railway and Clock House became an SECR station.

Southern Railway (1923-1947)
Following the Railways Act 1921 (also known as the Grouping Act), Clock House became a Southern Railway station on 1 January 1923.

The Mid-Kent line was electrified with the (750 V DC third rail) system and electric services commenced on 28 February 1926.  Early electric services were worked by early Southern Railway 3-car Electric Multiple Unit trains often built from old SECR carriages. In connection with the electrification the track bed in the Clock House area was raised in an effort to reduce flooding. Electrification led to further house building between Clock House and Elmers End.

British Railways (1948-1994)
After World War II and following nationalisation on 1 January 1948, the station fell under the auspices of British Railways Southern Region. Three-aspect colour light signals were installed at the station in 1956 controlled by New Beckenham signal box (in the down direction) and Elmers End (up direction).

The signal box at the station was taken out of use on 19 August 1962 where it presumably had been used to control access to the goods yard.

The goods yard was closed on 19 April 1965.

On 28 May 1975 all signalling came under the control of the London Bridge Signalling Centre.

Upon sectorisation in 1982, three passenger sectors were created: InterCity, operating principal express services; and London & South East (renamed Network SouthEast in 1986) who operated commuter services in the London area.

The privatisation era (1994-Present Day)
Following privatisation of British Rail on 1 April 1994 the infrastructure at New Beckenham station became the responsibility of Railtrack whilst a business unit operated the train services. On 13 October 1996 operation of the passenger services passed to Connex South Eastern who were originally due to run the franchise until 2011.

Following a number of accidents and financial issues Railtrack plc was sold to Network Rail on 3 October 2002 who became responsible for the infrastructure.

On 27 June 2003 the Strategic Rail Authority decided to strip Connex of the franchise citing poor financial management and run the franchise itself. Connex South Eastern continued to operate the franchise until 8 November 2003 with the services transferring to the Strategic Rail Authority's South Eastern Trains subsidiary the following day.

On 30 November 2005 the Department for Transport awarded Govia the Integrated Kent franchise. The services operated by South Eastern Trains transferred to Southeastern on 1 April 2006.

Services 

The typical off-peak service in trains per hour is:
 4 tph to 

On Sundays, the station is served by a half-hourly service between Hayes and London Charing Cross via Lewisham.

Accessibility 
Platform 2 (trains towards Hayes) has step-free access, but Platform 1 (trains towards London) has access available via steps only.

Connections

 station is an 8-minute walk from this station, and has trains between London Victoria and Orpington, which are also operated by Southeastern. Beckenham Road tram stop is a 3-minute walk, which has Tramlink services to Croydon.

London Buses routes 194, 227, 354 and 358 serve the station.

Notes

References

External links 

 Beckenham History

Railway stations in the London Borough of Bromley
Former South Eastern Railway (UK) stations
Railway stations in Great Britain opened in 1890
Railway stations served by Southeastern